Thomas Austin Robertson (September 9, 1848 – July 18, 1892) was a U.S. Representative from Kentucky.

Born in Hodgenville, Kentucky, Robertson pursued preparatory studies.
He was graduated from Cecilian College and afterwards from the law department of the University of Louisville.
He was admitted to the bar in 1871 and commenced practice at Hodgenville, Kentucky.
County attorney of LaRue County 1874-1877.
He served as member of the State house of representatives in 1877 and 1878.
Commonwealth attorney of the eighteenth judicial district 1878-1883.

Robertson was elected as a Democrat to the Forty-eighth and Forty-ninth Congresses (March 4, 1883 – March 3, 1887).
He served as chairman of the Committee on Expenditures in the Department of War (Forty-ninth Congress).
He was an unsuccessful candidate for renomination in 1886.
He resumed the practice of law at Elizabethtown, Kentucky, and died there July 18, 1892.
He was interred in Red Hill Cemetery, Hodgenville, Kentucky.

References

External links 
 

1848 births
1892 deaths
People from Hodgenville, Kentucky
Democratic Party members of the Kentucky House of Representatives
Democratic Party members of the United States House of Representatives from Kentucky
19th-century American politicians